The following is a list of prominent people who were born in or have lived in the Malaysian state of Sarawak, or for whom Sarawak is a significant part of their identity.

A 
 Aaron Ago Dagang – politician, born in Kanowit, Sibu
 Aimanaimin Khusairi – footballer
 Abang Abdul Rahman Zohari Abang Openg – 6th Chief Minister of Sarawak, born in Limbang
 Abang Abu Bakar Abang Mustapha – former Minister in the Prime Minister's Department and former member of parliament for Asajaya
 Abang Haji Openg – 1st Governor of Sarawak
 Abang Muhammad Salahuddin – 3rd and 6th Governor of Sarawak, born in Kampung Nangka, Sibu
 Abdul Rahman Ya'kub – 4th Governor of Sarawak and 3rd Chief Minister of Sarawak, born in Kampung Jepak, Bintulu
 Abdul Taib Mahmud – 7th Governor of Sarawak and 4th Chief Minister of Sarawak, born in Miri
 Adenan Satem – 5th Chief Minister of Sarawak, born in Kuching
 Ahmad Lai Bujang – member of parliament for Sibuti
 Ahmad Zaidi Adruce – 5th Governor of Sarawak, born in Sibu
 Aidil Mohamad – footballer, born in Mukah
 Alan Ling Sie Kiong – lawyer and politician, born in Sibu
 Albert Kwok – leader of a resistance fighter known as the "Kinabalu Guerrillas" in Jesselton Revolt, Jesselton (present-day Kota Kinabalu in neighbouring Sabah) during Japanese occupation of British Borneo, born in Kuching
 Alexander Nanta Linggi –  federal Minister of Domestic Trade and Consumer Affairs and member of parliament for Kapit
 Alex Wong (SingleTrackMind) – independent musician and singer as well a retired professional jet ski racer
 Alice Lau Kiong Yieng – member of parliament for Lanang, born in Sibu
 Amirul Hakim – actor, television broadcast journalist and news presenter for TV3, born in Kuching
 Anding Indrawani Zaini – singer, host & actor, born in Kuching
 Annuar Rapaee – member of State Legislative Assembly for Nangka, born in Sibu
 Anthony Lee Kok Hin – prelate
 Ashri Chuchu – footballer
 Aslina Chua – tennis player, born in Kuching
 Awang anak Raweng – Iban scout headman, born in Nanga Skrang, Sri Aman
 Azizan Saperi – footballer, born in Kuching

B 
 Baru Bian – politician, born in Lawas
 Billy Abit Joo – member of parliament for Hulu Rajang
 Benedict Martin – footballer
 Benedict Sandin – Iban ethnologist, historian, and curator of the Sarawak Museum in Kuching
 Bertram of Sarawak – member of the family of White Rajahs who ruled Sarawak for a hundred years, born in Kuching
 Bolly Lapok – bishop, born in Sebemban, Sri Aman
 Bryan Nickson Lomas – diver, born in Kuching

C 
 Camelia – singer and model, born in Kuching
 Celestine Ujang Jilan – politician and former Speaker for State Legislative Assembly
 Chan Seng Khai – 2nd mayor for Kuching South City Council, born in Kuching
 Chong Chieng Jen – lawyer and politician, born in Kuching
 Chong Ted Tsiung – 3rd mayor for Kuching South City Council, born in Kuching
 Clare Rewcastle Brown – British investigative journalist, born in Sarawak

D 
 Dan Sullivan – Australian politician, born in Kuching
 Daniel Bego – swimmer, born in Kuching
 Dayang Nurfaizah – singer, born in Kuching
 Depha Masterpiece – musician and member of Masterpiece, born in Kapit
 Dewi Liana Seriestha – singer, model, beauty pageant title holder and the first Malaysian to win the Miss World Talent title in Miss World 2014 competition, born in Kuching
 Dion Cools – Belgian-Malaysian footballer, born in Kuching
 Ding Kuong Hiing – member of parliament for Sarikei
 Douglas Uggah Embas – Deputy Chief Minister of Sarawak and former member of parliament for Betong
 Dunstan Endawie Enchana – former Deputy Chief Minister of Sarawak and member of State Legislative Assembly for Krian, Saratok
 Dzulazlan Ibrahim – footballer

E 
 Elizabeth Jimie – diver, born in Kuching

F 
 Fadillah Yusof – Malaysian Works minister, born in Kampung Hilir, Sibu
 Fareez Tukijo – footballer
 Fatimah Abdullah – member of State Legislative Assembly for Dalat as the Welfare, Community Wellbeing, Women, Family and Childhood Development minister

G 
 George Chan Hong Nam – former Deputy Chief Minister of Sarawak, state Industrial Development minister and state Tourism and Heritage minister, born in Miri
 Gilbert Cassidy Gawing – footballer, born in Miri

H 
 Hafiz – singer, born in Kuching
 Hairol Mokhtar – footballer, born in Kuching
 Harrison Ngau Laing – environmentalist and former member of parliament
 Hasbi Habibollah – member of parliament for Limbang
 Henry Golding – British-Malaysian actor, born in Sarawak
 Henry Sum Agong – member of parliament for Lawas

I 
 Idris Jala – former Minister in the Prime Minister's Department, born in Bario

J 
 Jacob Dungau Sagan – member of parliament for Baram, born in Long Anap, Ulu Baram
 James Chan Khay Syn – 4th Mayor of Kuching South City Council, born in Kuching
 James Chin – Professor of Asian Studies at the University of Tasmania and leading scholar of Malaysian politics and society, born in Kuching
 James Dawos Mamit – former member of parliament for Mambong
James Jemut Masing – Deputy Chief Minister of Sarawak
 James Wan – Australian film director, screenwriter, and producer, born in Kuching
 James Wong – 1st Deputy Chief Minister of Sarawak and former Leader of the Opposition, born in Limbang
 Jason Lo – music artist, producer, DJs, entrepreneur and former chief executive officer of Tune Talk, born in Kuching
 Jelaing Mersat – former member of parliament of Saratok
 Jessie Chung – singer-songwriter, musician, oncologist, actress, author, naturopath, and nutritional consultant, born in Kuching
 Jimmy Raymond – footballer
 Joseph Entulu Belaun – Minister in the Prime Minister's Department and member of parliament for Selangau
 Joseph Kalang Tie – footballer
 Joseph Salang Gandum – former member of parliament for Julau
 Juanda Jaya – politician and former Mufti of Perlis
 Jugah Barieng – Paramount Chief of the Iban people and former Sarawak Internal Affairs minister
 Julian Tan Kok Ping – former member of parliament for Stampin

K 
 Kanang anak Langkau – national hero and soldier from the Iban-Dayak community
 Kennedy Edwin – musician and member of Masterpiece, born in Kanowit, Sibu
 Koreyoshi Kurahara – Japanese screenwriter and director, born in Kuching
 Kuda Ditta – athletics, competitor at the 1964 Summer Olympics

L 
 Lana Nodin – model and actress, born in Kuching
 Larissa Ping Liew - Miss World Malaysia 2018, born in Kuching.
 Law Hieng Ding – former Science, Technology and the Environment minister
 Leo Michael Toyad – former member of parliament for Mukah
 Leo Moggie Irok – former politician and chairman board member of Tenaga Nasional
 Lily Eberwein – nationalist and women's right activist
 Liu Shan Bang – Sarawak Chinese historical warrior
 Lynda Ghazzali – entrepreneur and porcelain painter

M 
 Muhammad Adam Afandi Shaharudin – footballer
 Made Katib – former Anglican bishop
 Malcom Mussen Lamoh – member of State Legislative Assembly for Batang Ai
 Masir Kujat – member of parliament for Sri Aman
 Mathew Ngau Jau – Sapeh master and Malaysia's Living National Heritage. Performs and also making the musical instrument, born in Long Semiyang
 Mazwandi – footballer
 Margaret Lim – Canadian-Malaysian book author
 Melvin Sia – actor, model and singer
 Melvin Wong Hwang Chee – entrepreneur, speaker and businessman as well founder of FanXT, born in Kuching
 Michael Manyin – member of State Legislative Assembly for Tebedu
 Mohd Azlan Iskandar – squash player, born in Kuching
 Mohd Effendi Norwawi – businessman, administrator and politician, former Agriculture minister

N 
 Nancy Shukri – Minister of Tourism, Arts and Culture and member of parliament for Batang Sadong
 Natasha Seatter – Malaysian-Scottish female racing driver, born in Miri
 Nicholas Teo – Malaysian singer based in Taiwan, born in Kuching
 Norah Abdul Rahman – former member of parliament for Tanjong Manis
 Neil Paul Sakai - Martial Artist, Wadoryu Karate Sensei and appointed as First Senior Zone (SEA) Instructor for Sakuukai Karate Federation , Japan

O 
 Ong Kee Hui – politician and founder of Sarawak United Peoples' Party, born in Kuching
 Ong Poh Lim – Malayan/Singaporean badminton player, born in Kuching
 Ong Tiang Swee – renowned Chinese leader and businessman, born in Kuching

P 
 Pandelela Rinong – diver, born in Bau
 Peter Chin Fah Kui – former Energy, Green Technology and Water minister and member of parliament for Miri
 Peter John Jaban – DJ on Radio Free Sarawak and human rights campaigner

Q

R 
 Reeshafiq Alwi – footballer
 Rentap – Iban-Dayak historical warrior
 Richard Riot Jaem – Special Envoy of the Prime Minister of Malaysia and member of parliament for Serian, born in Serian
 Robert Lau Hoi Chew – former Deputy Minister for Transport and member of parliament for Sibu, born in Sibu
 Robert Raymer – American writer and writing facilitator, born in Grove City, Pennsylvania and migrated to Kuching
 Rodney Akwensivie – Ghanaian-Malaysian footballer, born in Serian
 Rohani Abdul Karim – member of parliament for Batang Lupar
 Rosli Dhobi – nationalist, born in Kampung Pulo, Sibu
 Rubiah Wang – member of parliament for Kota Samarahan
 Rynn Lim – singer and actor, born in Kuching

S 
 Stephen Mundaw - Liutenant General-Datuk-Former commander of the Eastern Field Command-(Highest Malaysian Army Officer), born in Simanggang
 Sanjay Singh – squash player, born in Miri
 Sapok Biki – boxer, born in Simunjan
 Shahrol Saperi – footballer
 Shaun Maloney – English-Scottish footballer, born in Miri
 Sherie Merlis – actress, born in Sibu
 Sim Kui Hian – cardiologist and Sarawak Local Government and Housing minister
 Simoi Peri – politician
 Stella Chung – actress and singer
 Stephen Kalong Ningkan – 1st Chief Minister of Sarawak, born in Betong
 Stephen Yong Kuet Tze – former Cabinet minister
 Sulaiman Abdul Rahman Taib – former Deputy Tourism minister
 Sulaiman Daud – former member of parliament for Petra Jaya
 Syarif Masahor – Sarawak Malay historical warrior

T 
 Tawi Sli – 2nd Chief Minister of Sarawak
 Thane Bettany – English actor and dancer, born in Sarawak
 Tiki Lafe – former member of parliament for Mas Gading
 Tiong Hiew King – businessman and founder of Rimbunan Hijau, born in Sibu
 Tiong King Sing – Special Envoy of the Prime Minister of Malaysia and member of parliament for Bintulu
 Tiong Thai King – former member of parliament for Lanang
 Traisy Vivien Tukiet – diver
 Tsai Horng Chung – Chinese-Malaysian painter, born in China and migrated to Sarawak during Japanese occupation of British Borneo
 Tsai Ming-liang – Taiwanese filmmaker, born in Kuching
 Tuanku Bujang Tuanku Othman – 2nd Governor of Sarawak

U

V 
 Valentino Bong – Filipino-Malaysian squash player, born in Kuching
 Venice Elphi – footballer, born in Kuching
 Violet Yong Wui Wui – politician

W 
 Wahab Dolah – former member of parliament for Igan
 Wan Junaidi – Minister of Entrepreneur Development And Co-operatives and member of parliament for Santubong
 Watson Nyambek – sprinter, born in Miri
 Watt Marcus – musician and member of Masterpiece, born in Sibu
 Welson Sim – swimmer, born in Kuching
 Wee Han Wen – architect and chairman of the Miri City Council
 Wee Kheng Chiang – businessman, born in Kuching
 Wee Kheng Ming – actor
 William Nyallau Badak – member of parliament for Lubok Antu
 Willy Edwin – musician and member of Masterpiece, born in Kanowit, Sibu
 Wilson Nyabong Ijang – politician, member of State Legislative Assembly for Pelagus
 Wong Ho Leng – former Opposition leader of Sarawak State Assembly, born in Sibu
 Wong Ling Biu – politician
Wong Soon Koh – Opposition Leader of Sarawak State Assembly

X

Y 
 Yi Jet Qi – Taiwanese singer and songwriter, born in Miri
 Yong Khoon Seng – former member of parliament for Stampin
 Yong Mun Sen (Yong Yen Lang) – artist and one of the founder of Nanyang Academy of Fine Arts in Singapore, born in Kuching

Z 
 Zamri Morshidi – footballer
 Zee Avi – singer-songwriter, guitarist and ukulele player, born in Miri
 Zulkifli Che Ros – weightlifter

See also 
 Demographics of Sarawak

References 

 
Sarawak